Jokūbas Bernardas Šernas (30 July 1925 – 3 July 2015), commonly known as Jacques Sernas and sometimes credited as Jack Sernas, was a Lithuanian-born French actor with an international film career.

Biography

He was born in Kaunas, Lithuania, the son of Jokūbas Šernas, a signatory of the 1918 Act of Independence of Lithuania, who died when Sernas was one year old. His mother took him to Paris, France, where Sernas received his formal education. During World War II, he joined the French Resistance and was captured and interned at the Nazi Buchenwald concentration camp, near Weimar, Germany. After the war, Sernas was considering a career in medicine and then in journalism before turning to films. His first role was in Miroir (1946).

In June 1955 Sernas married the Roman journalist Maria Stella Signorini. They had a daughter Francesca born in 1956.

Career
Sernas worked first as a leading man and later as a character actor.  He is perhaps best known for his role as Paris in the epic film Helen of Troy (1956).

Sernas also appeared on American television, including the lead role in the 1956 Warner Brothers time travel production "Man from 1997" featuring James Garner.

His more recent appearances have included appearing as a Cardinale Feltin in the television biographical film  (2002) and as Ambasciatore in the television comedy film  (2005). For the last 30 years Sernas lived and worked in Rome.

Filmography

See also

List of Lithuanian actors
List of French actors

References

External links

 

1925 births
2015 deaths
20th-century French male actors
20th-century French people

21st-century French male actors
21st-century French people

Buchenwald concentration camp survivors
French male film actors
French Resistance members
French male television actors
Male actors from Paris
Nastro d'Argento winners
Lithuanian emigrants to France